Chambley-Bussières is a commune in the Meurthe-et-Moselle department in north-eastern France.

Chambley-Bussières Air Base is located here.

See also
Communes of the Meurthe-et-Moselle department
Parc naturel régional de Lorraine

Sources
 
 lannuaire.service-public.fr: Mairie de Chambley-Bussières

References

Chambleybussieres